The Serbia national football team represents Serbia in men's international football competition. It is controlled by the Football Association of Serbia, the governing body for football in Serbia.

After the breakup of SFR Yugoslavia and its football team in 1992 Serbia was represented (alongside Montenegro) within the new FR Yugoslavia national football team. Despite qualifying for Euro 92 the team was banned from participating in the tournament due to international sanctions, with the ruling also enforced for World Cup 94 and Euro 96 qualifiers. The national team played its first friendly in December 1994, and with the easing of sanctions the generation of the 1990s eventually participated at World Cup 1998, reaching the round of 16, and the quarter-finals at Euro 2000. The team played in the 2006, 2010, 2018 and 2022 FIFA World Cup tournaments, but failed to progress past the group stage on each occasion.

Between February 2003 and June 2006 Serbia participated as Serbia and Montenegro due to the countries name change. Following a 2006 referendum Montenegro declared its independence, leading to separate football federations which resulted in the teams final renaming and establishment as the Serbia national football team. Serbia is considered by FIFA and UEFA to be the official successor of both the Kingdom of Yugoslavia/SFR Yugoslavia, and FR Yugoslavia/Serbia and Montenegro national football teams.

History

Serbia within Yugoslavia (1920–1992)

The Football Federation of what was then the Kingdom of Serbs, Croats and Slovenes (later Yugoslavia) was founded in Zagreb in 1919 under the name Jugoslavenski nogometni savez (Yugoslavian Football Association). Jovan Ružić was the first Serb to represent the national team in its international debut match, a 7-0 drubbing by Czechoslovakia at the 1920 Olympic Games in Antwerp, Belgium.

In 1921 the Belgrade Football Subassociation organized a friendly match between the France national football team and a Belgrade XI, dubbed the "Serbian representatives". The team featured footballers from SK Jugoslavija and BSK, two of the Serbian clubs of the interwar period. The French delegation was on a four-game tour of Yugoslavia with the last exhibition game being played in Belgrade's SK Jugoslavija Stadium on 3 July. Prince Regent Aleksandar I and FIFA President Jules Rimet were in attendance as the visitors triumphed 3–0.

In the lead-up to the 1930 FIFA World Cup a dispute regarding the relocation of the FAs headquarters from Zagreb to the capital Belgrade erupted, culminating in a boycott by the Zagreb Subassociation which disallowed its members to participate in the upcoming tournament. The de facto Serbian team led by coach Boško Simonović, composed largely of players from Belgrade's BSK, SK Jugoslavija and BASK, reached the semi-final, losing to hosts and eventual winners Uruguay 6–1. The royal interbellum era featured footballers such as Blagoje Marjanović, Aleksandar Tirnanić, Milorad Arsenijević, Đorđe Vujadinović, Branislav Sekulić and Milutin Ivković. Due to the dismemberment of Yugoslavia during World War II the football federation and national team ceased activities but reformed following the end of hostilities.

In 1945 Svetislav Glišović led the first unofficial national team representing the Federal State of Serbia in a tournament held to mark the end of World War II. The Serbian team encompassing the newly established Red Star squad won its first game by beating FS Montenegro 2–1, FS Croatia 3–1 in the semi-final, then proceeding to win the tournament against the Yugoslav People's Army team 1–0 in Belgrade.

The reconstituted Yugoslavia reached the UEFA European Championship finals in 1960 and 1968, and finished fourth place at the 1962 FIFA World Cup. During its existence Serbian footballers would continually play a role in the Yugoslav national team throughout the socialist era, with the likes of Rajko Mitić, Branko Stanković, Vladimir Beara, Vujadin Boškov, Todor Veselinović, Miloš Milutinović, Borivoje Kostić, Milan Galić, Vladimir Durković, Velibor Vasović, Dragan Džajić, Jovan Aćimović, Dušan Bajević, Vladimir Petrović and others until the states disintegrated in the 1990s. The national team of SFR Yugoslavia played its last game on 25 March 1992, losing 2–0 to the Netherlands.

FR Yugoslavia/Serbia & Montenegro era (1992–2006)

While the Federal Republic of Yugoslavia, consisting of Serbia and Montenegro, was formed on 27 April 1992, its teams were banned from all international sporting events, including the national football team as a result of U.N. sanctions stemming from the conflict in Yugoslavia. Consequently, the national team did not play its first game as a new country before 23 December 1994, a friendly match played in Porto Alegre and in which Brazil won 2–0. This was the first ever team composed of Serbian and Montenegrin players exclusively, while Slobodan Santrač, a former Yugoslavia national team player, was named the team's first ever manager. The next game was played three days later, this time in Buenos Aires, resulting in a 1–0 loss to Argentina.

Due to international sanctions, the team could not participate in 1994 World Cup qualifying nor the Euro 1996 qualifying process.

1998 World Cup

As FR Yugoslavia joined FIFA and UEFA in 1994, the team was available to participate in the 1998 World Cup qualifiers. Slobodan Santrač was appointed manager for the team. In the qualifiers, Yugoslavia was drawn in Group 6 with Euro 1996 runners-up Czech Republic, Slovakia, Spain, Faroe Islands and Malta. With 23 points, Yugoslavia ended up in second place behind Spain. Yugoslavia qualified for the play-off in which they were drawn to play against Hungary. Winning 12–1 on aggregate, Yugoslavia qualified for the World Cup.

The draw put the team in Group F alongside Germany, the United States, and Iran. Yugoslavia won its first game 1–0 against Iran thanks to a goal from defender Siniša Mihajlović. The next game was a draw for Yugoslavia; after leading Germany 2–0, a free kick from Michael Tarnat deflected off Mihajlović and into the goal, then Oliver Bierhoff equalised it at 2–2 at the 80th minute. Yugoslavia responded in the next game against the United States and won 1–0 due to a goal in the fourth minute by Slobodan Komljenović. Yugoslavia finished second in the group and Germany won the group with a better goal difference.

Due to their second position, Yugoslavia saw itself face the Netherlands in the Round of 16. Yugoslavia entered in the match with a sole attacker, but its defensive tactics proved unsuccessful as Dennis Bergkamp put the Netherlands in front in the 38th minute. Following the start of the second half, Yugoslavia pressured the Dutch, who conceded a header from Komljenović. The turning point of this match was a penalty awarded to Yugoslavia after Vladimir Jugović was fouled. Predrag Mijatović missed, and the scoreline remained the same at 1–1. Such an event demoralized the Yugoslavs, as the Dutch took the initiative. In the late seconds of the game Edgar Davids' shot towards the Yugoslav net from a distance of 20 meters and beat goalkeeper Ivica Kralj. This marked the end of Yugoslavia's run in the 1998 World Cup.

Euro 2000 

The draw for the Euro 2000 qualifiers saw first-seeded Yugoslavia drawn in a group with Croatia, thus marking the first games between the two teams after the breakup of Yugoslavia. The other teams in the group were the Republic of Ireland, Macedonia, and Malta. Milan Živadinović was dismissed and was replaced by Vujadin Boškov.

The team started with a 1–0 win over Ireland in Belgrade, before beating Malta 3–0 in Ta' Qali. The home fixture against the Maltese followed, but was moved to Thessaloniki, Greece due to the NATO bombing of Yugoslavia. The team won 4–1. The first match against Croatia took place in Belgrade after the bombing ended, and was interrupted due to a power outage at the beginning of the second half, resuming after 43 minutes and eventually finishing 0–0. A 2–1 defeat against Ireland in Dublin was followed by victories home and away against Macedonia (3–1 and 4–2 respectively), meaning that Yugoslavia needed to win its final qualifier against Croatia in Zagreb, or to draw with Ireland failing to beat Macedonia in Skopje, in order to qualify automatically for Euro 2000. In the event, Ireland conceded an injury-time equaliser, meaning that Yugoslavia's 2–2 draw with the Croatians put them through.

The draw for the finals placed Yugoslavia in Group C along with Spain, Norway and another former Yugoslav republic, Slovenia. The Slovenians took a 3–0 lead in the first game at the Stade du Pays de Charleroi, but three goals in six second-half minutes enabled Yugoslavia to secure a 3–3 draw. The team then beat Norway 1–0 in Liège, thanks to an early Savo Milošević backheel strike. The final group game, against Spain in Bruges, saw the Yugoslavs take the lead three times, before a Gaizka Mendieta penalty and an Alfonso strike in injury-time secured a 4–3 win for the Spaniards and top spot in the group. Yugoslavia nonetheless finished second, level on points with Norway but ranked ahead due to its victory in Liège. In each of the three games, the team had one player sent off (Siniša Mihajlović, Mateja Kežman, and Slaviša Jokanović, respectively). In the quarter-finals, Yugoslavia was paired with the Netherlands. The co-hosts won 6–1 in Rotterdam with Patrick Kluivert scoring a hat-trick. Despite Yugoslavia's elimination, Savo Milošević was crowned the joint top scorer of the tournament alongside Patrick Kluivert. Both players scored five goals, although Milošević played one game fewer.

2002 World Cup campaign 

Ilija Petković replaced Boškov as head coach in July 2000. For the 2002 World Cup qualifiers, Yugoslavia was drawn in Group 1 with Russia, Slovenia, Switzerland, the Faroe Islands and Luxembourg. After winning against Luxembourg, Petković was sacked and replaced with a three-pieced team which consisted of Boškov, Dejan Savićević and Ivan Ćurković. Despite winning both games against Luxembourg and Faroe Islands as well and away game against Switzerland, Yugoslavia managed to suffer a home loss and away draw against Russia, a home draw against Switzerland and both draw games against Slovenia. Yugoslavia ended the qualifying campaign in the third place of the group just one point behind second-placed Slovenia.

Euro 2004 campaign 

Savićević was appointed as coach in July 2002. For the Euro 2004 qualifiers Yugoslavia was drawn in Group 9 with Italy, Wales, Finland and Azerbaijan. During qualifying, the country went under a political transformation, and the newly named Serbia and Montenegro appeared for the first time in a game against Azerbaijan in February 2003. In June, after a 2–1 loss to Azerbaijan, Savićević resigned and was replaced by Ilija Petković. Despite drawing both games against group favourites and eventual group winners Italy and winning both games against runners-up Wales, Serbia and Montenegro failed to qualify, mostly due to a 2–2 home draw, the 2–1 loss to Azerbaijan, as well and a 3–0 away loss to Finland.

2006 World Cup 

Petković remained as manager for the team; however, qualifying for 2006 World Cup was different. With six wins and four draws, Serbia and Montenegro ended up first in the group with an undefeated record in their qualification group ahead of Spain, Belgium, Bosnia and Herzegovina, Lithuania and San Marino. The Serbia and Montenegro team also allowed only one goal in the ten matches, the best defensive record of all 51 teams participating in qualification.

On 3 June 2006, following a referendum, Montenegro declared its independence from Serbia. As the World Cup was about to start, it was decided that the Serbia and Montenegro team that had qualified for the tournament would compete, with the split into separate teams representing the new countries of Montenegro and Serbia to take place once the team was no longer in the tournament.

In the group stage, Serbia and Montenegro lost their opening game to the Netherlands. The final score was 1–0 after Arjen Robben scored the only goal of the game. They also lost their second game to Argentina 6–0, Serbia and Montenegro's worst ever international result. With the team's two losses and with Netherlands and Argentina winning both their games, Serbia and Montenegro could no longer qualify for the knockout matches and was playing for pride alone in their final group game against Ivory Coast. After a 2–0 lead for much of the first half, the Elephants managed to come back and win 3–2, leaving Serbia and Montenegro with no points.

Independent Serbia (2006–present)

Euro 2008 campaign

Javier Clemente, Serbia's first-ever foreign coach, was appointed to lead the team for the 2008 Euro campaign. After Montenegro declared independence, Serbia marked their split from Montenegro with a 3–1 win over the Czech Republic. For the Euro 2008 qualifiers, Serbia was drawn in Group A along with Poland, Portugal, Belgium, Finland, Kazakhstan, Armenia and Azerbaijan. A strong start in qualification was overshadowed by the final hurdle of matches where inconsistency took over, the side dropping points against the likes of Finland, Belgium, Armenia and Kazakhstan. They eventually finished third, three points behind runners-up Portugal and Group A winners Poland. Clemente was sacked after the team's failure to qualify.

Serbia replaced Clemente with Miroslav Đukić, who then left the position on 19 August of the following year without having played any official games, due to disagreements with the Football Association of Serbia.

2010 World Cup

Subsequent to Ðukić's departure, Radomir Antić was appointed coach. Serbia's World Cup qualification campaign began in 2008. Their qualification group featured 1998 World Cup winners and 2006 World Cup runners-up France, Romania, as well as Austria, Lithuania and the Faroe Islands. Serbia played consistently during the qualifiers and this led to the team automatically qualifying for the 2010 FIFA World Cup in South Africa. They confirmed qualification with a 5–0 win at home against Romania.

The 2010 World Cup team featured captain Dejan Stanković, who became the only player to feature in a World Cup having played under three different national names (although he never changed nationality; this was a result of geopolitical events involving the identity of Yugoslavia). They were to face Ghana, Germany and Australia.

Their opening group game was against Ghana and chances came to both sides but a red card to Aleksandar Luković and a handball by substitute Zdravko Kuzmanović in the second half gave Ghana a penalty to take all three points at the death. Asamoah Gyan converted eight minutes from full-time and Serbia were defeated 1–0. In Serbia's second group match, they defeated Germany by a score of 1–0 with a goal by Milan Jovanović in the first half. FIFA's official YouTube channel called the win "the most famous day in Serbia's footballing history".

Serbia only needed a single point to reach the knockout stages, but was defeated by Australia 2–1. Australia scored two goals in the second half through Tim Cahill and Brett Holman. A late Marko Pantelić goal served only as a consolation. They finished last in the group.

Euro 2012 campaign

Radomir Antić was sacked two games into the Euro 2012 qualification process, a 1–1 draw at home to Slovenia spelling the end to his two-year stint. The sacking meant the bringing in of Vladimir Petrović to the job.

For the Euro 2012 qualifying, Serbia was drawn in Group C featuring Italy, Slovenia, Estonia, Northern Ireland and the Faroe Islands. The qualifying stage began with Radomir Antić as coach and finished with Vladimir Petrović. Serbia and Antić started the first two games with a 3–0 win away to Faroe Islands and a 1–1 draw at home to Slovenia but this result brought the end of Antić's reign as the country's coach. New coach Petrović faced setbacks with a 3–1 loss at home to Estonia and an abandoned match resulting in a 3–0 loss to Italy due to crowd trouble from the Serbian away supporters in Genoa.

Serbia returned to form with a 2–1 win at home over Northern Ireland but could only manage a 1–1 draw away to Estonia. Afterwards, Serbia won back to back games with a 1–0 win away to Northern Ireland and a crucial 3–1 win at home against Faroe Islands. These results put Serbia in pole position to confirm a play-off spot behind Italy.

Serbia needed a win at home against Italy to confirm a play-off spot but their efforts only resulted in a 1–1 draw. The team, however, still had one more chance to confirm a play-off place when they faced Slovenia away. This game was a must-win even though Serbia had a superior goal difference over Estonia; a draw was not good enough for progression. Neither side played decisively better in the first half, but a long-range goal put Slovenia up 1–0 at half time. In the second half, Nemanja Vidić missed penalty. Serbia left empty-handed after a 1–0 loss and exited the tournament for the third time in a row during the qualifying group stages, missing out by one point behind Estonia. Serbia once again failed to qualify for the European Championships. Vladimir Petrović was sacked after the team's failure to qualify.

2014 World Cup campaign

Ahead of the qualifying campaign for the 2014 FIFA World Cup, Dejan Stanković and Nemanja Vidić announced that they were retiring from international football. Branislav Ivanović became the new captain. Siniša Mihajlović, a former member of the national team, was appointed as the coach on 24 April 2012. Serbia was drawn in Group A in qualification for the 2014 World Cup, together with Croatia, Belgium, Scotland, Macedonia, and Wales. The team began the qualification campaign with a goalless draw with Scotland and a 6–1 win over Wales. In the next two games, Serbia suffered two defeats, from Macedonia and Belgium.

On 22 March 2013, Serbia played in Zagreb against Croatia. The game was highly anticipated in both countries due to their rivalry both on and off the pitch. Croatia won 2–0. Serbia then defeated Scotland 2–0 at home in a crucial qualifier, though their World Cup hopes were taken away after a 2–1 defeat to Belgium. Serbia drew with Croatia 1–1 in the corresponding fixture at home, where 18-year-old Aleksandar Mitrović scored an equalizer in the second-half after Mario Mandžukić opened the scoring. They then defeated Wales 3–0 in Cardiff. Dejan Stanković's farewell game was completed in a friendly against Japan, which Serbia won 2–0. He finished his career with 103 appearances for the national team, a record previously held by Savo Milošević, with 102 appearances. Serbia finished qualifying with a 5–1 home win against Macedonia, putting them in third in the group, three points from a playoff spot behind Croatia and group winners Belgium.

Euro 2016 campaign

After failing to qualify for the 2014 World Cup, Dick Advocaat was appointed as the coach in 2014. Serbia was drawn in Group I in qualification for UEFA Euro 2016, together with Portugal, Denmark, Albania and Armenia. Advocaat started with a draw in a friendly 1–1 game against France. The team began qualification with a 1–1 draw against Armenia. The following game was a game against Albania in Belgrade, abandoned as a result of crowd trouble after a drone carrying an Albanian flag and a map of Greater Albania was flown over the pitch. Serbia was originally awarded with a 3–0 victory by UEFA, and deducted three points, but on 10 July 2015, the Court of Arbitration for Sport (CAS) reversed the earlier decision and awarded Albania a 3–0 win. On 14 November 2014, Serbia played against Denmark in Belgrade and lost, 1–3. After this game, Advocaat left, whereupon Radovan Ćurčić was announced as a new coach on 25 November.

Serbia's first match in 2015 was a qualifying match against Portugal in Lisbon, during which Serbia lost 2–1, cutting their chances for qualification to Euro 2016. On 13 June 2015, Serbia played a qualifying match against Denmark in Copenhagen, losing 2–0. With the 10 July ruling by CAS on the abandoned game against Albania, Serbia would become mathematically eliminated from Euro 2016 qualification. On 4 September 2015, Serbia had their first victory, winning 2–0, against Armenia. On 8 October 2015, Serbia defeated Albania with a goal each from Aleksandar Kolarov and Adem Ljajić. In the table of Group I, Serbia finished second to last place with four points in a five-team group.

2018 World Cup

After failing to qualify for Euro 2016, Slavoljub Muslin was appointed as a coach. Serbia was drawn in Group D in qualification for the 2018 FIFA World Cup with Euro 2016 semi-finalists Wales, Austria, Ireland, Georgia and Moldova. They started off their campaign with a 2–2 draw against Ireland at the Red Star Stadium and eventually won against Austria, Georgia and Moldova.

Serbia beat Moldova in Belgrade with goals from Aleksandar Kolarov, Aleksandar Mitrović and Mijat Gaćinović. This consolidated their first position going into their top-of-the group clash with Ireland. They won this match with a 55th-minute goal from Kolarov. Serbia finished the qualifying campaign with a 1–0 home win against Georgia, and ended at the top of Group D and therefore qualified for the 2018 tournament. Despite Serbia's qualification, Muslin was sacked by the Football Association of Serbia as a result on differences regarding team selection. Muslin was criticized for not inviting Sergej Milinković-Savić to play in the campaign which sparked controversy in Serbia. Mladen Krstajić took the place as a temporary coach after Muslin's dismissal and led the team in the World Cup.

In the World Cup, Serbia opened their match against Costa Rica. Kolarov's free kick at the second half meant Serbia won their first World Cup game in eight years. Serbia lost their later encounters, losing 1–2 to Switzerland with a 90th-minute goal scored by Xherdan Shaqiri and 0–2 to Brazil, thus being eliminated in the group stage.

2018–19 UEFA Nations League

Due to performance of Serbia in previous years, the country found itself started the campaign of the inaugural Nations League, where they were drawn into Group 4 with Montenegro, Lithuania and Romania. With both wins against Lithuania and Montenegro and both draw games against Romania, Serbia finished on top of the group, securing the Euro 2020 play-off spot and being promoted into League B for 2020–21 season. With six goals, Aleksandar Mitrović finished the tournament as the top scorer.

Euro 2020 campaign

In December 2017, Mladen Krstajić became the permanent coach for Serbia. Serbia started the campaign of 2018–19 UEFA Nations League, which served as a part of UEFA Euro 2020 qualifying campaign.

For Euro 2020 qualifiers, Serbia was drawn into Group B with Euro 2016 champions Portugal, Ukraine, Lithuania and Luxembourg. Serbia kicked off the qualifiers with 1–1 away draw against Portugal. But in the next away game against Ukraine, Serbia lost the game 0–5. After the 4–1 home win against Lithuania, Krstajić was sacked mainly because of the loss against Ukraine and replaced with Ljubiša Tumbaković. Tumbaković started with a 2–4 home loss against Portugal. The next two games were away wins against Luxembourg and Lithuania, before beating Luxembourg at home. Serbia could not take one of the top two places after the team managed a 2–2 draw to Ukraine at home.

After the UEFA Euro 2020 qualifying play-offs were resumed, Serbia placed itself against Norway in Oslo. Two goals, one in extra time helped Serbia to overcome Norway 2–1, thus marching to the final playoff game against Scotland at home. The game was won by Scotland in a penalty shootout (5–4) after the game was tied 1–1 after full time. Serbia once again failed to qualify for the Euros, making 20 years since the country last took part in the tournament. Tumbaković was sacked after the team's failure to qualify for the tournament.

2022 World Cup

Serbia was drawn in Group A in qualification for the 2022 FIFA World Cup with Portugal, Republic of Ireland, Luxembourg and Azerbaijan.

After a penalty shootout loss against Scotland in the Euro 2020 qualifying play offs, Ljubiša Tumbaković was sacked and replaced with Dragan Stojković.

Serbia started qualification with a 3–2 win against the Republic of Ireland in Belgrade in March 2021. After a 2–2 draw against Portugal, Serbia won against Azerbaijan in Baku 2–1. Mixed results meant Serbia needed a victory against Portugal to qualify directly from the group. On 14 November 2021, Serbia faced Portugal at the Estádio da Luz, and trailed by a goal. However, an equaliser by Dušan Tadić and a decisive goal from Aleksandar Mitrović in the final minutes of the second half meant Serbia automatically booked a ticket for Qatar.

Serbia was drawn in Group G with Brazil, Switzerland and Cameroon. Despite qualifying from the first place of Group A, Serbia ended on disappointing last place with only one point. Serbia was defeated in the first game against Brazil 0–2 as expected. But in the next game against Cameroon, Serbia unexpectedly ended the match in draw with result being 3–3. The last match against Switzerland was overshadowed by brawl between Granit Xhaka and several Serbian players ending up in a fight. Eventually, Serbia lost the game against Switzerland with the result 2–3.

2022–23 UEFA Nations League

Serbia was drawn in 2022–23 UEFA Nations League B Group 4 alongside Norway, Sweden and Slovenia, finishing first and being promoted after wins against Sweden at home and Norway in Oslo.

Rivalries
 Serbia v. Croatia: The rivalry stems from political roots, and is listed as one of the ten greatest international rivalries by Goal.com. and as the most politically charged football rivalry by the Bleacher Report. The two sides started the football rivalry in the 1990 when they were part of Yugoslavia, which dissolved after a series of wars. The two nations have played four times, with Croatia winning one and drawing the other three games.
 Serbia v. Albania: The rivalry stems from historical tensions and the Kosovo question.

Team image
The badge of the Football Association of Serbia is modelled on the Serbian cross inescutcheon featured on the Serbian coat of arms. It consists of a modified version of the four firesteels and cross, with the addition of a football. The team is nicknamed "the Eagles" (Serbian Cyrillic: Орлови) in reference to the white double-headed eagle, a national symbol of Serbia. In 2022 the Football Association of Serbia launched a new, national team specific emblem for brand and marketing purposes. The previous FA crest was replaced by a stylised logo inspired by the lesser coat of arms of the Republic of Serbia.

For years following the breakup of SFR Yugoslavia the national team experienced an identity crisis, which despite its name, was seen as de facto representative of Serbia. From 1994 to 2006 the obsolete and unpopular Communist era national anthem "Hej, Sloveni" was often jeered, booed and whistled by home supporters as players refrained from singing the lyrics. During this period the team continued to officially carry the old nickname "Plavi" (the Blues), badge and kit design indicative of the Yugoslav tricolour.

Following the secession of Montenegro in 2006 the national team adopted red shirts, blue shorts and white socks in honor of the Serbian tricolour. Between 2010 and 2016 a cross motif inspired by the country's coat of arms was incorporated in the jersey. In years Serbia has utilised all-red uniforms due to FIFA's kit clash regulations. Away kits are traditionally white with blue or white shorts.

Serbia does not have an official national stadium and the team has played at grounds throughout the country. The Rajko Mitić Stadium is the most popular venue following by Partizan Stadium, both ground are located in the capital city Belgrade.

Kit sponsorship

In July 2014, a partnership was announced between the Football Association of Serbia and English manufacturer Umbro which is Serbia's official supplier before Puma took over with their home and away kits, debuting 7 September 2014 in the friendly match against France. On 7 September 2014, Serbia unveiled their latest kits also worn at the UEFA Euro 2016 qualifiers campaign.

Results and fixtures 
For more result see: Serbia national football team results

The following is a list of match results from the previous 12 months, as well as any future matches that have been scheduled.

2022

2023

Coaching staff

Manager history

For the period before 1992 see: Yugoslavia national football team#Head coaches

Players

Current squad
The following players are on a preliminary list for a UEFA Euro 2024 qualifying games against Lithuania and Montenegro on 24 and 27 March 2023.

Caps and goals as of 25 January 2023, after the match against United States.

Recent call-ups
The following players have also been called up for the team in the last twelve months.

Notes
 PRE Preliminary squad
 SUS Suspended
 INJ Withdrew from the roster due to an injury
 COV Withdrew from the roster due to COVID-19
 RET Retired from the national team
 WD Withdrew from the roster for non-injury related reasons

Previous squads

FIFA World Cup squads
 1930 FIFA World Cup squad
 1950 FIFA World Cup squad
 1954 FIFA World Cup squad
 1958 FIFA World Cup squad
 1962 FIFA World Cup squad
 1974 FIFA World Cup squad
 1982 FIFA World Cup squad
 1990 FIFA World Cup squad
 1998 FIFA World Cup squad
 2006 FIFA World Cup squad
 2010 FIFA World Cup squad
 2018 FIFA World Cup squad
 2022 FIFA World Cup squad

UEFA European Football Championship squads
 UEFA Euro 1960 squad
 UEFA Euro 1968 squad
 UEFA Euro 1976 squad
 UEFA Euro 1984 squad
 UEFA Euro 2000 squad

Player records

Players in bold are still active with Serbia.

Most capped players

Top goalscorers

Captains (since 1994)

Notable players 

Goalkeepers

Defenders

Midfielders

Forwards

Competition records
Serbia was part of Yugoslavia and its national football team which existed between 1920–1992. With the collapse of Yugoslavia, the remaining constituent republics, Serbia and Montenegro, formed the Federal Republic of Yugoslavia in 1992. The country underwent a name change in 2003, and Montenegro left the state union in 2006. FIFA and UEFA consider the Football Association of Serbia a direct successor to the Football Association of Yugoslavia, thereby attributing all records to Serbia.

FIFA World Cup

UEFA European Championship

UEFA Nations League record

Last update : 27 September 2022

Other
Summer OlympicsGold Medal: 1960
Silver Medal: 1948, 1952, 1956
Bronze Medal: 1984
Mediterranean GamesWinners: 1971, 1979
Balkan CupWinners: 1934–35, 1935
Runners-up: 1929–31, 1932, 1933, 1946, 1947, 1977–80
1945 Yugoslav Football TournamentWinners''': 1945

Head-to-head records (2006 onward)

See also

 Serbia national football team results
 Serbia and Montenegro national football team results
 Serbia national under-23 football team
 Serbia national under-21 football team
 Serbia national under-20 football team
 Serbia national under-19 football team
 Serbia national under-17 football team
 List of Serbia international footballers (including predecessor teams)
 Yugoslavia national football team
 Serbia and Montenegro national football team

Notes

References

External links

Official
Football Association of Serbia – official site 
FIFA profile
Serbian National Football Team 
UEFA team profile
FIFA team profile

Unofficial
Beli Orlovi 
Serbian football at xtratime.org
BeliOrlovi.rs – fan site 
RSSSF – Serbia men's national football team international matches

 
European national association football teams
2006 establishments in Serbia
Football in Serbia